USNS Apache (T-ATF-172), the fifth United States Navy ship of the name, was the last of the Powhatan class of fleet ocean tugs. Apache was delivered to the U.S. Navy on 23 July 1981. She was operated by Military Sealift Command and crewed by 18 civil service mariners (CIVMARS). She is designed to provide the Navy with towing service, and when augmented by Navy divers, assist in the recovery of downed aircraft and ships. There were quarters on board for up to 22 additional personnel.

Background
Fleet ocean tugs are used to tow ships, barges, and targets for gunnery exercises. They are also used as platforms for salvage and diving work, as participants in naval exercises, to conduct search and rescue missions, to aid in the cleanup of oil spills and ocean accidents, and to provide fire fighting assistance.

Features
Apache is equipped with a 10-ton-capacity crane and a bollard pull of at least 87 tons. This allows for the bolting down of a wide variety of portable equipment. The large rear deck is also painted for helicopter operations to allow for vertical replenishment at sea. There are two GPH diesel off-ship fire pumps supplying three fire monitors with up to 2,200 gallons of foam per minute. A deep module can be embarked to support naval salvage teams.

Propulsion

The shafts are connected to controllable pitch propellers (CPP). The engines can be operated from one of three stations on the bridge, at the engine operating station, and from an aft control station looking astern. Usually controlled from the bridge by deck officers, they allow control of the engines' RPMs and propeller pitch independently. Together with twin rudders and a  bow thruster, the ship is highly maneuverable at slow speeds with extremely quick engine response.

Towing equipment
The ship can employ one of two winches for towing operations. The main towing winch for large, long distance tows is a single drum, closed-loop SMATCO electro-hydraulic drive winch, with a mechanically, pneumatically, or hydraulically actuated band brake and an air-actuated dog brake which are capable of holding 500,000 lbf of tension. The winch has  of 2¼-inch IWRC 6×37 wire rope with a poured end fitting and a breaking strain of 424,000 lbf (1.89 MN). The cable weighs approximately 8.5 lb per foot (12.6 kg/m), making the weight of the wire approximately 21,500 lb (10.75 short tons) excluding the weight of any chain bridle used on the ship being towed.

The second winch is a traction machine capable of handling up to  synthetic hawsers used for smaller, shorter distance tows.

The stern employs a tow-pin box capable of capturing either the wire or synthetic towing lines, as well as Norman pins at the quarters.

Service history
Apache began service with the Military Sealift Command in 1981 in the Atlantic. Among her early assignments was a mission in September 1982 towing the battleship USS Iowa (BB-61) from the Philadelphia Naval Shipyard at Philadelphia, Pennsylvania to Westwego, Louisiana, where Iowa began modernization work preparatory to her return to active service.

Apache towed the decommissioned destroyer USS Barry (DD-933) on the Anacostia River in Washington, D.C., on 18 November 1983.

On 31 October 2015 Apache searched and located the missing cargo ship SS El Faro, which was lost with all hands during Hurricane Joaquin, on 1 October 2015, east of the Bahamas.  Apache used the CURV 21, a deep ocean remotely operated vehicle, to survey and confirm the identity of the wreckage. The initial search was conducted over three days using a pinger locator, attempting to listen for the ping from the El Faro'''s black box recorder.  This was unsuccessful, so the Apache'' switched equipment to use a side scanning sonar, which located the wreck in 15,000 feet of water.

Military Sealift Command hosted a ceremony for the inactivation of the ship at Joint Expeditionary Base Little Creek-Fort Story, Virginia on 26 August 2022 and the ship was officially placed in stricken status on 30 September 2022.

References

External links 

 NavSource Online: Service Ship Photo Archive USNS Apache (T-ATF-172)
 Military Sealift Command Ship Inventory: USNS Apache   (T-ATF-172)
 U.S. Navy Fact File: Fleet Ocean Tugs – T-ATF
 
 

 

Tugs of the United States Navy
Cold War auxiliary ships of the United States
Ships built by Marinette Marine
1981 ships